The National Archives of Gabon were founded in 1969.

See also 
 List of national archives

References 

Gabon
Museums in Gabon
Gabonese culture
Government agencies established in 1969